Zafar Ahmad Nizami (25 November 1939 —  23 April 2009) was an Indian author, poet and writer. He served the Jamia Millia Islamia as Professor of Political Science for about 30 years and  authored books like Memarān-e-Jamia, Hindustān ke chand Siyasi Rahnuma, Maulana Azad Ki Kahani and Tarīkh-e-Hind: Ahd-e-Jadeed.

Biography
Nizami was born on 25 November 1933 in Pratapgarh, Rajasthan. He pursued M.A degrees in English (1959) and Political Science (1961) from Vikram University, Ujjain.
He taught in the colleges of Jaora, Ratlam, Sehore and Datia as a lecturer and then moved to Jamia Millia Islamia where he taught in the department of Political Science as a professor. He later became its head professor. He also served Institute of Objective Studies, New Delhi as director. He retired from the Jamia Millia Islamia in 2001. He died on 23 April 2009 in Escorts Hospital Delhi.

Literary works
Nizami's works include:
 Memarān-e-Jamia (Urdu) — (The Founders of Jamia Millia Islamia).
 Hindustān ke chand Siyasi Rahnuma 
Maulana Azad Ki Kahani 
Tarīkh-e-Hind: Ahd-e-Jadeed 
Builders of Modern India: Hakim Ajmal Khan
Dr. Zakir Hussain: A Pictorial Biography
Qalmi Khāke
Azadi-e-Hind Ki Jaddojahd Mai Musalmano Ka Kirdar (Vol 1) 
 Jamaat-e-Islami: Spearhead of Separatism

Legacy
Following research studies are few guided by Nizami:
 Gandhis technique of mass mobilization by Madan Mohan Verma.
 Diplomacy in Islam by Mohammad Ali Nasir Homoud.
 A study of India's political and economic co operation with Asean count by Suman Chaudhary.

See also
 List of Indian writers
 Dia Mirza
 Tapan Kumar Pradhan
 Shyam Benegal

References

Indian Muslims
1933 births
2009 deaths
Academic staff of Jamia Millia Islamia
Vikram University alumni
Scholars from Rajasthan
People from Pratapgarh district, Rajasthan
Urdu-language writers from India
Writers from Rajasthan